Kwame Dzudzorli Gakpey is a Ghanaian politician. He is the Member of Parliament for the Keta constituency in the Volta Region of Ghana

Early life and education 
Gakpey completed his Basic Education Certificate Examination (BECE) in 1990 and the Senior School Certificate Examination (SSCE) in 1993. He obtained a diploma in shipping and export management in 1998 and a post graduate diploma in marketing in 2003. He proceeded to complete various health courses after his secondary education leading to certificates in Health Social Sciences for Research, Leadership in strategic Health management, Malaria planning and management and Parasitic disease management between 2004 and 2016. He also has a degree in public health.

Politics 
In December 2020, Gakpey stood for the Keta constituency seat in the 2020 Ghanaian general election on the National Democratic Congress ticket. This followed the decision of the incumbent MP, Richard Quashigah who was one of eleven MPs who decided to retire from parliament. He won the seat with a majority of 72.1%. He sits on the Food, Agriculture and Cocoa Affairs Committee as well as the Members Holding Offices of Profit Committee in parliament. In January 2022, he sponsored a youth apprenticeship programme in the constituency.

He has been the victim of two armed attacks. The first was in December 2020 and the second in January 2021. He believed these were targeted and not random attacks. Three persons went on trial for the first assault in December 2020.
.

References 

Ghanaian MPs 2021–2025
1975 births
Living people
People from Volta Region
National Democratic Congress (Ghana) politicians